Codeine is the twenty-second studio album by American rapper Z-Ro, released on December 1, 2017 under 1 Deep Entertainment and was distributed by EMPIRE. The album features guest appearances from Lil' Keke, Big Baby Flava, Jhonni Blaze, and Lil Flea.

Track listing

Charts

References 

2017 albums
Z-Ro albums